RAF Penrhos is a former Royal Air Force airfield located near Penrhos, Gwynedd and  west of Porthmadog, Gwynedd, Wales, in the community of Llanbedrog.

It was operational from 1 February 1937 to 21 October 1946 for armament training, air observer, bombing and gunnery schools.

History
In 1936 a decision was taken to establish an RAF bombing school at Penyberth, including the area of the low plateau in the bend of the river where the Afon Penrhos joins the Afon Geirch.  Opposition was strongly felt, particularly as it was perceived that the sixteenth century house, Penyberth was, in Saunders Lewis’ words, 'one of the essential homes of Welsh culture, idiom and literature'.  As work proceeded, an arson attack was carried out on 8 September 1936 after which the arsonists gave themselves up at Pwllheli Police Station.  Despite this the base came into operation in February 1937.

In December 1940 a detachment from No. 312 (Czechoslovak) Squadron was moved to protect Penrhos from German attack. This association led in later years to the Polish Resettlement Corps using the site to house Polish soldiers, sailors and airmen who chose not to return to communist Poland. To this day, part of RAF Penrhos is in use as an old people's home for elderly Poles.

RAF Hell's Mouth 5 miles to the south west was commissioned in February 1937 as a Relief Landing Ground, later an Emergency landing Ground for RAF Penrhos.

The following units were posted here at some point:
 'C' Flight of No. 1 Anti-Aircraft Co-operation Unit RAF (1 AACU)
 'J' Flight of 1 AACU
 No. 1 Air Observers School RAF
 No. 2 Air Crew Holding Unit RAF
 No. 2 Service Flying Training School RAF.
 No. 5 Armament Training Camp RAF with Westland Wallaces
 No. 5 Armament Training Station RAF
 No. 5 Flying Training School RAF
 No. 5 Service Flying Training School RAF
 No. 6 Flying Training School RAF
 No. 6 Service Flying Training School RAF
 No. 9 Air Observers School RAF with Handley Page Harrows and Fairey Battles the unit was renamed No. 9 Bombing & Gunnery School two months later
 No. 9 (Observers) Advanced Flying Unit RAF
 No. 9 Service Flying Training School RAF
 No. 10 Flying Training School RAF
 No. 10 Service Flying Training School RAF
 No. 11 Service Flying Training School RAF
 No. 12 Flying Training School RAF
 No. 12 Operational Training Unit RAF
 No. 12 Service Flying Training School RAF
 No. 63 Squadron RAF
 No. 258 Squadron RAF
 A detachment of No. 312 (Czechoslovak) Squadron RAF with Hawker Hurricanes until April 1941
 No. 2780 Squadron RAF Regiment
 Signals Instructor School RAF

During the late 1980s privately owned aircraft used to land here during the summer on a 400-yard tarmac strip.

Current use

Part of the site is now Pen-y-berth caravan park.

References

Citations

Bibliography
Annand, David. RAF Penrhos near Pwllheli 1937-45 and RAF Llandwrog near Caernarvon 1940-45. Tywyn : David Annand, 1986. 

http://www.heneb.co.uk/llynhlc/llynhlcareasenglish/geirch14.html

External links

Royal Air Force stations in Wales
Royal Air Force stations of World War II in the United Kingdom